Joose Olavi Hannula (5 September 1900 in Turku – 12 June 1944) was a Finnish colonel and historian.

He went to military school in the 1920s, and served at Nylands regiment and in the 1st divisions staff. He was a lecturer in history of war at the academy of military sciences in Finland 1927–39. As commendant for a regiment and a brigade he died during the Continuation war 1941–44 at Salla.

Bibliography 
Clausewitz sotateoreetikkona (1927)
Napuen taistelu (1929)
Itäarmeijan operaatioiden suunnittelu ja johto v. 18 (1932)
Sotataidon historia (3 parts, 1933)
Maailmansodan historia (2 parts, 1935–36)
Hakkapeliittoja ja karoliineja (1939)
Suomi taistelee (3 parts, with B. Fagerström och B. Sandberg, 1940)

References

External links 
About J.O. Hannula's book on the Finnish civil war

20th-century Finnish historians
1944 deaths
1900 births
Military historians